The 18th annual Ale Kino! International Young Audience Film Festival was held from 15 to 20 May 2000. A number of 54 movies took part.

The movies were presented in four cinemas in Poznań: Apollo, Olimpia, Rialto and Muza.

The movies were judged by professional and children jury, as well as by International Centre of Films for Children and Young People (CIFEJ).

Awards

References

External links
 18th Ale Kino! Official Homepage
 18th Ale Kino! at the Internet Movie Database

Ale Kino! Festival
Ale Kino! Festival
Ale Kino! Festival, 18
Ale Kino! Festival